The 2022 Kazakhstan Super Cup was the 13th Kazakhstan Super Cup, an annual football match played between the winners of the previous season's Premier League, Tobol, and the winners of the previous season's Kazakhstan Cup, Kairat. The game was played on 2 March 2022 at the Astana Arena in Nur-Sultan, with Tobol beating Kairat 2–1 with Aybar Zhaksylykov scoring a 89th-minute winner. Serikzhan Muzhikov gave Tobol the lead in the 30th minute from the penalty spot, before João Paulo equalised for Kairat 10 minutes later.

Match details

See also
2021 Kazakhstan Premier League
2021 Kazakhstan Cup

References

2022
FC Tobol matches
FC Kairat matches
Supercup